Erik M. Conway (born 1965) is the historian at NASA's Jet Propulsion Laboratory at the California Institute of Technology in Pasadena. He is the author of several books. He previously completed a Ph.D. from the University of Minnesota in 1998, with a dissertation on the development of aircraft landing aids.

In High-Speed Dreams (2005), Conway argues that U.S. government sponsorship of supersonic commercial transportation systems resulted from Cold War concerns about a loss of technological prowess in the modern world. Realizing the Dream of Flight (2006) consists of eleven essays on individuals prepared in honor of the one hundredth anniversary of the Wright brothers' first powered flight. Conway also wrote Blind Landings (2007) and he is a co-author of a secondary-level education text entitled Science and Exploration (2007). Atmospheric Science at NASA was published in 2008.

His 2010 book Merchants of Doubt was co-authored with Naomi Oreskes, as was his article in the Winter 2013 issue of Daedalus called The Collapse of Western Civilization: A View from the Future.

Bibliography

 High-Speed Dreams (2005)
 Realizing the Dream of Flight (2006)
 Blind Landings (2007)
 Science and Exploration (2007)
 Atmospheric Science at NASA (2008)
 Merchants of Doubt (co-authored with Naomi Oreskes; 2010)
 The Collapse of Western Civilization: A View from the Future (Daedalus, 2013)
 The Big Myth: How American Business Taught Us to Loathe Government and Love the Free Market (co-authored with Naomi Oreskes; Bloomsbury, 2023)

Notes and references

External links 
 Erik M. Conway personal website
 What's in a Name? Global Warming vs. Climate Change

1965 births
Living people
21st-century American historians
21st-century American male writers
American male non-fiction writers
American non-fiction environmental writers
Jet Propulsion Laboratory
NASA people
Place of birth missing (living people)
Scientific American people